Landtag elections in the Free State of Mecklenburg-Strelitz (Freistaat Mecklenburg-Strelitz) during the Weimar Republic were held at irregular intervals between 1918 and 1932. Results with regard to the total vote, the percentage of the vote won and the number of seats allocated to each party are presented in the tables below. On 31 March 1933, the sitting Landtag was dissolved by the Nazi-controlled central government and reconstituted to reflect the distribution of seats in the national Reichstag. The Landtag subsequently was formally abolished as a result of the "Law on the Reconstruction of the Reich" of 30 January 1934 which replaced the German federal system with a unitary state.

1918
The 1918 Mecklenburg-Strelitz state election was held on 15 December 1918 to elect the 42 members of the constituent assembly.

1919
The 1919 Mecklenburg-Strelitz state election was held on 30 March 1919 to elect the 35 members of the Landtag.

1920
he 1920 Mecklenburg-Strelitz state election was held on 16 May 1920 to elect the 36 members of the Landtag.

1923
The 1923 Mecklenburg-Strelitz state election was held on 8 July 1923 to elect the 35 members of the Landtag.

1927
The 1927 Mecklenburg-Strelitz state election was held on 3 July 1927 to elect the 35 members of the Landtag.

1928
The 1928 Mecklenburg-Strelitz state election was held on 29 January 1928 to elect the 35 members of the Landtag.

1932
The 1932 Mecklenburg-Strelitz state election was held on 13 March 1932 to elect the 35 members of the Landtag.

References

Elections in Mecklenburg-Western Pomerania
Elections in the Weimar Republic
Mecklenburg-Strelitz
Mecklenburg-Strelitz
Mecklenburg-Strelitz
Mecklenburg-Strelitz
Mecklenburg-Strelitz
Mecklenburg-Strelitz
Mecklenburg-Strelitz